Zgornja Dobrava is a small settlement east of Moravče in central Slovenia. The area is part of the traditional region of Upper Carniola. It is now included with the rest of the municipality in the Central Slovenia Statistical Region.

Name
Zgornja Dobrava was attested in historical sources as Dobraw in 1386 and 1429.

History
Until 1953, when it was administratively separated and made a village in its own right, the neighboring village of Ples was a hamlet of Zgornja Dobrava.

References

External links

Zgornja Dobrava on Geopedia

Populated places in the Municipality of Moravče